A number of steamships have been named Noemi, including:

 , a 2,489 GRT cargo ship built in 1895
 , in service 1926–1930
 , in service 1961–1965

Ship names